Al Buainain (also spelled Al Bu'ainain, Al Bu'aynin and Al Boainain) is a clan of Bani Tamim tribe, and the clan is divided to three main branches which are al-Muhammad and al-Ali and Al-Nuwasir. The clan is based primarily in Eastern Province of Saudi Arabia, Qatar, United Arab Emirates and Bahrain. The tribe used to be involved in the lucrative pearl diving industry.

The Al Buainain tribe was one of the several bedouin tribes to move to Bahrain in 1783, after the Al Khalifa conquered the island.

History 
Al Bu 'Ainain have contributed in establishing the town of Jubail on the Hasa coast -northwest of Ras Tanura- following dissatisfaction in Qatar. They have also worked on building up one of Qatar's largest cities, Al Wakrah. J. G. Lorimer noted in his publication Gazetteer of the Persian Gulf that the Al-Buainain population in Al Wakrah was 2,000 in 1908. In the same publication, Lorimer reported that the tribe owned around 95 houses in Bahrain, mainly in the towns of Askar and Muharraq.

References

External links
 AI Buainain website
 Al Buainain Law Firm site in Bahrain

Tribes of Arabia
Bahraini families
Qatari families